The 1908–09 season was the first competitive season for Internazionale, which was founded in Milan on 9 March 1908.

Season 
Internazionale played its first match on 18 October 1908, facing Milan in Switzerland in a friendly in which they lost 2–1. Its first official match was again a derby - about three months later - valid for the qualifications to the domestic championship: this resulted in a second loss, with a 3–2 score for the cross-city rivals. After two weeks, losing also with U.S. Milanese (2–0), the newborn club failed to qualify for the final stage.

Squad 
Source:

  Carlo Cocchi (goalkeeper)
  Enrico Du Chene (midfielder)
  Virgilio Fossati (midfielder)
  Achille Gama (forward)
  Carlo Hopf (forward)
  Kappler (defender)
  Werner Kummer (midfielder)
  Hernst Marktl (defender)
  Mario Moretti (defender)
  Niedermann (defender)
  Ugo Rietmann (midfielder)
  Bernard Schuler (forward)
  Arnaldo Wolkel (midfielder)

Manager: Virgilio Fossati

Matches

Lombardy qualifications

Statistics

League results

Players statistics 
Appearances and goals are referred to domestic league.

Cocchi (2/−6); Du Chene (2); Fossati (2); Hopf (2); Kappler (2); Kummer (2); Marktl (2); Schuler (2/1); Wolkel (2); Gama (1/1); Moretti (1); Niedermann (1); Rietmann (1).

References 

Inter Milan seasons